Joe Jackson (born May 12, 1979) is a former American football offensive lineman who played one season with the Philadelphia Soul of the Arena Football League. He played college football at Baylor University. He was also a member of the Kansas City Chiefs and Frankfurt Galaxy.

Early years
Jackson played high school football at Groveton High School in Groveton, Texas. He earned all-state honors as a defensive tackle his senior year after recording 126 tackles, three pass deflections and three fumble recoveries. He also played offensive line.

College career
Jackson played for the Baylor Bears from 1998 to 2001, starting forty games. He was redshirted in 1997.

Professional career
Jackson signed with the Kansas City Chiefs after going undrafted in the 2002 NFL Draft. He played for the Frankfurt Galaxy of NFL Europe in 2003.

He was signed by the Philadelphia Soul on December 9, 2003. He was released by the Soul on December 16, 2004.

References

External links
Just Sports Stats

Living people
1979 births
American football offensive linemen
Baylor Bears football players
Kansas City Chiefs players
Frankfurt Galaxy players
Philadelphia Soul players
Players of American football from Texas
People from Groveton, Texas